The Detour Tour is the thirteenth concert tour by American recording artist Cyndi Lauper. The tour supports her eleventh studio album, Detour. The tour begins May 2016 in Nashville, Tennessee and continues with shows in North America and Europe.

Background
In March 2016, it was announced Lauper and Boy George were co-headlining shows in the United States. Later in the month, the singer revealed a full tour and announced her album. The tour features shows in the United Kingdom, her first since over five years. For the first leg of the tour, ticket sales were good, prompting a second round of dates in the U.S. When describing the vibe of the tour, Lauper stated:"When I was a really young kid, country music was pop music, so this is what we grew up listening to. These songs are part of some of my earliest memories, so it has been an absolute thrill to revisit them."

Opening acts
The Peach Kings 
Operator EMZ 
Rosie O'Donnell 
Indigo Girls

Setlist
The following setlist was obtained from the May 9, 2016 concert, held at the Ryman Auditorium in Nashville, Tennessee. It does not represent all shows during the tour.
"Funnel of Love"
"She Bop"
"Heartaches by the Number"
"I Drove All Night"
"The End of the World"
"Walkin' After Midnight"
"Detour"
"I Want to Be a Cowboy's Sweetheart"
"Dear John"
"You Don't Know"
"Money Changes Everything"
"Misty Blue"
"Time After Time"
"When You Were Mine"
"Girls Just Want to Have Fun"
"True Colors"

Tour dates

Festivals and other miscellaneous performances
Concerts co-headlined with Boy George
Glastonbury Festival
Jazz Fest Wien
Luglio suona bene
GruVillage Festival
Outlaw Field Summer Concert Series
Hardly Strictly Bluegrass

Cancellations and rescheduled shows

Broadcasts and recordings
Filmed from Austin's Moody Theatre on September 10, 2016, the performance aired on PBS television in January 2017.

External links
Cyndi Lauper's Official Website

References

2016 concert tours
Cyndi Lauper concert tours